Jovan Kirovski (born March 18, 1976) is an American former soccer player who is the Technical Director for the Los Angeles Galaxy in Major League Soccer. Kirovski is the first American to win the UEFA Champions League (although he did not play in the final) and the first to score in a Champions League match. He has won an MLS Cup championship as a player, assistant coach, and Technical Director.

Club career
Born in Escondido, California, Kirovski, is the son of Macedonian immigrants. He was a member of the Nomads Soccer Club from 1991. He joined Manchester United's youth team in 1992, becoming the first American-born player to sign with the club. He led the reserve team in scoring in 1996, but was not able to break into the first team because of work permit regulations. After that season, he signed with Borussia Dortmund in the German Bundesliga. Kirovski spent the next four seasons in Germany. He played in Dortmund's 1996–97 UEFA Champions League campaign, becoming the first American to win the competition. He earned significant playing time during the 1998–99 season, when Borussia loaned him out to second division club Fortuna Köln.

In 2000, Kirovski signed with Portuguese club Sporting CP After a season there, he went back to England, signing with Football League First Division club Crystal Palace. In 2002, Kirovski signed with Birmingham City, but after one and a half seasons, he signed with the Los Angeles Galaxy.

In his first season in MLS, Kirovski scored eight goals. In 2005, the Galaxy traded him to the Colorado Rapids for a first round pick in the 2007 MLS SuperDraft. After spending the 2008 season with the San Jose Earthquakes, he rejoined the Galaxy in a November 2008 trade. Kirovski enjoyed a successful stint with the Galaxy, winning an MLS Cup in 2011 with the club. On January 23, 2012, Kirovski retired from soccer but remained on the coaching staff for the LA Galaxy as an assistant coach. A member of Bruce Arena's coaching staff, Kirovski helped the team repeat as MLS Cup champions in 2012.

Kirovski was appointed by the LA Galaxy as the club's Technical Director on January 10, 2013. As Technical Director, Kirovski was instrumental in the creation of the club's USL affiliate LA Galaxy II, which was established in January 2014. Kirovski served as the point man in the Galaxy's pursuit and eventual signing of Mexican forward Giovani dos Santos in August 2015. He also aided the Galaxy in their signing of Jelle Van Damme a year later. Kirovski served as the lead in the Galaxy's signing of 2017 team Most Valuable Player Romain Alessandrini, as well as the addition of Mexican international Jonathan dos Santos in the same year. Kiroski led the team's pursuit of Swedish soccer legend Zlatan Ibrahimović, who joined the club officially in March 2018. Kirovski's rich global network from his time as a player helped to complete the deal.

International career
Kirovski made his debut for the United States national team at the age of 18 on October 19, 1994, against Saudi Arabia, and played at the 1996 Olympics and the 1999 and 2003 editions of the FIFA Confederations Cup. Kirovski earned 62 caps in total with the US.

International goals
Scores and results list the United States' goal tally first, score column indicates score after each Kirovski goal.

Coaching career
Kirovski joined Los Angeles Galaxy as assistant coach immediately upon his retirement in January 2012. In January 2013, the Galaxy appointed him as the club's technical director.

Honors
Borussia Dortmund
UEFA Champions League: 1996–97
Intercontinental Cup: 1997

Los Angeles Galaxy
MLS Cup: 2005, 2011
Lamar Hunt U.S. Open Cup: 2005
Western Conference: 2005, 2009, 2010, 2011

References

1976 births
Living people
American expatriate soccer players
American expatriate sportspeople in England
Expatriate footballers in England
American expatriate soccer players in Germany
American expatriate sportspeople in Portugal
Expatriate footballers in Portugal
Manchester United F.C. players
Borussia Dortmund players
SC Fortuna Köln players
Sporting CP footballers
Crystal Palace F.C. players
Birmingham City F.C. players
LA Galaxy players
Colorado Rapids players
San Jose Earthquakes players
Premier League players
Bundesliga players
2. Bundesliga players
Primeira Liga players
English Football League players
Major League Soccer players
Major League Soccer All-Stars
Sportspeople from Escondido, California
Soccer players from San Diego
American people of Macedonian descent
Olympic soccer players of the United States
Footballers at the 1996 Summer Olympics
United States men's international soccer players
1995 Copa América players
1996 CONCACAF Gold Cup players
1999 FIFA Confederations Cup players
2000 CONCACAF Gold Cup players
2003 FIFA Confederations Cup players
United States men's under-23 international soccer players
LA Galaxy non-playing staff
Association football forwards
American soccer players
UEFA Champions League winning players